Islwyn is a constituency in Wales represented in the House of Commons of the Parliament of the United Kingdom. The area, historically known for coal-mining, is a safe Labour Party seat which was once held by the party's former leader Neil Kinnock, who served as opposition leader for nearly a decade until 1992. The current Member of Parliament (MP) is Chris Evans, first elected at the 2010 general election.

Boundaries

1983–2010: The Borough of Islwyn.

2010–present: The Caerphilly County Borough electoral divisions of Aberbargoed, Abercarn, Argoed, Blackwood, Cefn Fforest, Crosskeys, Crumlin, Maesycwmmer, Newbridge, Pengam, Penmaen, Pontllanfraith, Risca East, Risca West, and Ynysddu.

Members of Parliament

Elections

Elections in the 1980s

Elections in the 1990s

Elections in the 2000s

Elections in the 2010s

Of the 145 rejected ballots:
53 were either unmarked or it was uncertain who the vote was for.
92 voted for more than one candidate.

See also
 Islwyn (Senedd constituency)
 List of parliamentary constituencies in Gwent
 List of parliamentary constituencies in Wales

References

External links
Politics Resources (Election results from 1922 onwards)
Electoral Calculus (Election results from 1955 onwards)
2017 Election House Of Commons Library 2017 Election report
A Vision Of Britain Through Time (Constituency elector numbers)

Parliamentary constituencies in South Wales
Constituencies of the Parliament of the United Kingdom established in 1983